Hans Martin Pippart (1888-1918) was a German First World War fighter ace credited with confirmed aerial victories over 15 enemy airplanes and seven observation balloons. Unusually, he first became an ace before joining a fighter squadron, scoring six victories with Kampfstaffel 1. Also unusually, he destroyed four observation balloons in this string of six victories. After a transfer to  Jagdstaffel 13, he scored his first four victories as a fighter pilot. Transferred to command Jagdstaffel 19, he would score 12 more wins before his death in action on 11 August 1918.

The victory list

Hans Martin Pippart's victories are reported in chronological order, which is not necessarily the order or dates the victories were confirmed by headquarters.

Abbreviations were expanded by the editor creating this list.

Footnote

Citations

Sources

 Guttman, Jon (2005). Balloon-Busting Aces of World War 1. Oxford UK, Osprey Publishing. .

Aerial victories of Pippart, Hans Martin
Pippart, Hans Martin